The 2010 football season was São Paulo's 81st season since club's existence. In this year Tricolor take part on its seventh consecutive Copa Libertadores however was defeated at semifinals by Internacional, that would be champion later, on away goal rule due a goal scored by opponent on Morumbi, 0–1 (away); 2–1 (home). The club came third in Campeonato Paulista losing at semifinals to rival Santos. In Série A ended in ninth position reaching a qualifying to Copa Sudamericana breaking the sequence of qualification to the Copa Libertadores, since 2004.

Current squad
Updated 21 July 2010

Out on loan

Transfers

In

Out

Competitions

Overall

Scorers

Managers performance

Campeonato Paulista

Record

Copa Libertadores

Record

Campeonato Brasileiro

Record

See also
São Paulo FC

References

External links
official website 

Brazilian football clubs 2010 season
2010